Berthold Wulf (July 2, 1926 – June 11, 2012) was a German priest, poet and philosopher.

Life 
Wulf was born in Hanover, Province of Hanover. He was the third child of Bertha Wulf and Karl Wulf, who was a musician and conductor. He spent his childhood with his elder brother and his twin brother in Hildesheim near Hanover. When he was 17 he had to join the German army. He survived World War II as a common soldier.

Religious work

After the war he became a goldsmith. But he came into contact with  anthroposophy and so he decided to become a priest of the Christian Community. In 1953 he received ordination to the priesthood in Stuttgart. Afterwards he worked as a priest in Berlin, Heidelberg, Heidenheim an der Brenz where he also taught the subject 'religion' at the local Rudolf Steiner School (Waldorfschule Heidenheim), and Zürich, where he worked until his retirement. In 1954 he married Ingeborg Köhler.

He has given more than 8,000 lectures and his complete edition consists of 26 volumes on 17,343 pages. Most of his work is poetry, but he also wrote philosophical books. His topics are anthroposophy and christianity.

Work (selection)
Canticum Mundi. Okeanos Verlag, Zürich
Ewiges Evangelium. Okeanos Verlag, Zürich
Melissa. Okeanos Verlag, Zürich
Goethe und Hegel. Okeanos Verlag, Zürich
Christentum und Sakrament. Okeanos Verlag, Zürich
Das mythische Jahr.Okeanos Verlag, Zürich
Nur einen Sommer.Okeanos Verlag, Zürich
Divinitas Mundi. Okeanos Verlag, Zürich
Idee und Liebe. Okeanos Verlag, Zürich
Gedanke und Gegenwart. Okeanos Verlag, Zürich
Natur und Geist. Okeanos Verlag, Zürich
Die Kategorien des Aristoteles. Okeanos Verlag, Zürich
Im Zeichen des Rosenkreuzes. Okeanos Verlag, Zürich
Christologie des Bewusstseins. Okeanos Verlag, Zürich
Das Jahr unseres Herrn. Okeanos Verlag, Zürich
Es kann geschehen…Bruchstücke einer grossen christlichen Konfession. Okeanos Verlag, Zürich
Jesus Christus vere homo vere Deus. Okeanos Verlag, Zürich
Anthropos Sophia. Okeanos Verlag, Zürich
Gott und Welt und Mensch. Okeanos Verlag, Zürich

References

1926 births
2012 deaths
Clergy from Hanover
20th-century German poets
Anthroposophists
People from the Province of Hanover
German male poets
German Army soldiers of World War II